Amar de Nuevo may refer to:

 Amar de Nuevo (album), a 1998 album by Inti-Illimani
 Amar de nuevo (TV series), a Spanish-language telenovela